{{DISPLAYTITLE:CH3NO2}}
The molecular formula CH3NO2 may refer to:

 Carbamic acid, compound with the formula H2NCOOH
 Methyl nitrite, organic compound with the chemical formula CH3ONO
 Nitromethane, organic compound with the chemical formula CH3NO2